Dalkeith railway station served the town of Dalkeith, Scotland, from 1838 to 1964 on the Dalkeith branch of the Edinburgh and Dalkeith Railway.

History 
The station opened in Autumn 1839, although passenger services may have run from 26 November 1838. It was situated to the west of Eskbank Road. Nearby there was a timber yard and a coal yard; the timber yard was situated to the south and the coal yard was situated to the north of the station. The station closed on 1 January 1917 but reopened on 1 October 1919, before closing permanently to passengers on 5 January 1942 and closing to goods on 10 August 1964.

The nearest station is now at Eskbank.

The site today 
Most of the station site is now a Morrisons supermarket. The site was also previously used as a bus depot after the station site was demolished.

References

External links 

Disused railway stations in Midlothian
Former North British Railway stations
Railway stations in Great Britain opened in 1838
Railway stations in Great Britain closed in 1917
Railway stations in Great Britain opened in 1919
Railway stations in Great Britain closed in 1942
1838 establishments in Scotland
1964 disestablishments in Scotland
Dalkeith